Operation Harpoon  may refer to:
 Operation Harpoon (1942), an Allied convoy sent to supply Malta in the Axis-dominated central Mediterranean Sea
 Operation Harpoon (2002), a Canadian-American operation against the Taliban in the Arma mountains of Afghanistan 
 Operation Harpoon, an operation by Israeli Mossad and Shurat HaDin targeting terrorist money networks

See also
 Operation Harpune, a major German deception plan of 1941 to conceal preparations for Operation Barbarossa